Frank Davies (birth unknown) is a former professional rugby league footballer who played in the 1960s and 1970s. He played at representative level for Wales, and at club level for Normanton, Huddersfield (13-years), Hunslet, Bramley and Keighley, as a goal-kicking , i.e. number 11 or 12, during the era of contested scrums.

International honours
Frank Davies won a cap for Wales while at Hunslet in 1978 against England.

References

External links
Paul Reilly leads list of former Huddersfield RL stars on show for Super League clash against Warrington Wolves
The Players Archive - Goal Kickers

Living people
Bramley RLFC players
English people of Welsh descent
English rugby league players
Huddersfield Giants players
Hunslet R.L.F.C. players
Keighley Cougars players
Rugby league players from Yorkshire
Rugby league second-rows
Wales national rugby league team players
Year of birth missing (living people)
Place of birth missing (living people)